Nickel Plate Provincial Park is a provincial park in British Columbia, Canada. Formerly known as Clearwater Park, it is located in the Similkameen District at the northeast corner of Nickel Plate Lake.

The park has recreational activities including hiking, fishing, paddling, canoeing and kayaking as well as winter recreation.

Images

See also
List of British Columbia Provincial Parks
List of Canadian provincial parks

References

Provincial parks of British Columbia
Similkameen Country
1938 establishments in British Columbia
Protected areas established in 1938